Lawrence D. Friday (born January 23, 1958) is a former professional American football defensive back in the National Football League. He saw action in one game for the Buffalo Bills in 1987.

References

1958 births
Living people
Players of American football from Jackson, Mississippi
American football defensive backs
Mississippi State Bulldogs football players
Buffalo Bills players
Pittsburgh Maulers players
Denver Dynamite (arena football) players
Detroit Drive players
New England Steamrollers players